Platanaster ('plate star') is an extinct genus of sea stars.

Taxonomy
†Palasteriscidae 
†Urasterellinae 
†Cnemidactis 
†C. girvanensis 
†Urasterella 
†U. asperrimus 
†Palasteriscinae 
†Lanthanaster 
†L. cruciformis 
†Platanaster 
†P. ordovicus 
†Baliactis 
†B. ordovicus

References 

Platyasterida
Prehistoric starfish genera